Ditlevsen is a surname. It is the surname of:

Knud Ditlevsen (1925–2006), Danish sprint canoer
Richard G. Ditlevsen Jr. (born 1957), American businessman and stunt performer
Sara Hjort Ditlevsen, Danish actor, 2012 winner of Bodil Award for Best Actress in a Leading Role
Susanne Ditlevsen, Danish mathematician and statistician
Tove Ditlevsen (1917–1976), Danish poet and author